The 2017–18 Columbia Lions men's basketball team represented Columbia University during the 2017–18 NCAA Division I men's basketball season. The Lions, led by second-year head coach Jim Engles, played their home games at Levien Gymnasium in New York City as members of the Ivy League. They finished the season 8–19, 5–9 in Ivy League play to finish in a tie for fifth place and fail to qualify for the Ivy League tournament.

Previous season
The Lions finished the 2016–17 season 11–16, 5–9 in Ivy League play to finish in fifth place. They failed to qualify for the inaugural Ivy League tournament.

Offseason

Departures

2017 recruiting class

Roster

Schedule and results

|-
!colspan=9 style=| Non-conference regular season

|-
!colspan=9 style=| Ivy League regular season

Source

See also
 2017–18 Columbia Lions women's basketball team

References

Columbia Lions men's basketball seasons
Columbia
Columbia
Columbia